Lūznava Parish is an administrative unit of the Rēzekne Municipality, Latvia. The administrative center of the parish is the village Lūznava, the main attraction is the Lūznava Manor.

See also 
 Lūznava Manor

References

External links
Lūznava parish municipality council website (Latvian only)

Parishes of Latvia
Rēzekne Municipality